Coleophora dignella is a moth of the family Coleophoridae. It is found in Spain, France, Italy, Germany, the Czech Republic, Austria, Romania, North Macedonia, Greece and southern and northern Russia.

The larvae feed on the seeds of Onobrychis species.

References

dignella
Moths described in 1961
Moths of Europe